Andezeno (Piedmontese: Andzen) is a comune (municipality) in the Metropolitan City of Turin in the Italian region Piedmont, located about  southeast of Turin.

Andezeno borders the following municipalities: Marentino, Montaldo Torinese, Chieri, and Arignano.

Etymology
According to Italian philologist and linguist Dante Olivieri, the name Andezeno originates from the Gallo-Latin word Andicus, which is said to be derived from the names of two villages, Andico and Andicello.

Economy
Andezeno was predominantly an agricultural community until the 1960s when the area surrounding the city of Turin underwent major industrialisation. Today, it mostly home to small businesses and enterprises.

Notable natives
Piero Gobetti (1901–1926), intellectual and journalist – parents were from Andezeno and he lived there at his family home are various times of his life
Claudio Marchisio (b. 1986), footballer for Juventus and the Italian national team – born in the city of Turin and raised in Andezeno, where his parents still live.

References

Cities and towns in Piedmont